Sodium orthosilicate is the chemical compound with the molecular formula .  It is one of the sodium silicates, specifically an orthosilicate, formally a salt of the unstable orthosilicic acid .

Uses
Sodium orthosilicate has been considered as an interfacial tension reducing additive in the waterflooding of oil fields for enhanced oil extraction.  In laboratory settings, it was found to be more effective than sodium hydroxide for some types of oil.

Sodium orthosilicate has been found to stabilize ferrate films as an anticorrosion treatment of iron and steel surfaces.

Natural occurrence
Sodium orthosilicate has not been found in nature.  However, the mineral chesnokovite, chemically the related salt disodium dihydrogen orthosilicate []2[] · 8, was recently identified in the Kola Peninsula.

See also
 Sodium metasilicate,

References

Silicates